Tuberoschistura is a small genus of stone loaches found in Southeast Asia.

Species
There are currently two recognized species in this genus:
 Tuberoschistura baenzigeri (Kottelat, 1983)
 Tuberoschistura cambodgiensis Kottelat, 1990

References

Nemacheilidae
Fish of Asia